Anthony Paul Burman (born 3 June 1958) is an English semi-professional football manager and former player. He was last the interim manager of National League South club Dartford in 2019.

References

1958 births
Living people
Footballers from Stockwell
English footballers
Association football forwards
Charlton Athletic F.C. players
Dartford F.C. players
Redbridge Forest F.C. players
Bromley F.C. players
Erith & Belvedere F.C. players
English Football League players
English football managers
Dartford F.C. managers
National League (English football) managers